Leonard Stephen "Len" Marchand,  (November 16, 1933 – June 3, 2016) was a Canadian politician.  He was the first person of First Nations status to serve in the federal cabinet, after being the first Status Indian elected and serving as a Member of Parliament. He served as Parliamentary Secretary, Minister of State, Minister of the Environment and Senator.

Early life
Marchand was born in Vernon, British Columbia on November 16, 1933. A member of the Okanagan Indian Band, he attended school at the Okanagan Indian Day School, the Kamloops Indian Residential School and Vernon high school. He went on to graduate from the University of British Columbia in 1959 with a bachelor of science degree in agriculture. In 1964 Marchand later completed a masters degree in range management from the University of Idaho. After pursuing a career as an agronomist, he left the field in the mid-1960s to work with the North American Indian Brotherhood. His work in native affairs took him to Ottawa to lobby on Aboriginal issues. He was hired as a special assistant to two successive Cabinet ministers.

Career
Marchand entered politics and was elected to the House of Commons in the 1968 election as a Liberal Party candidate for the British Columbia riding of Kamloops-Cariboo. He defeated high-profile Progressive Conservative candidate E. Davie Fulton. He was the first Status Indian to be elected as an MP.

He became parliamentary secretary to Jean Chrétien, who was the Minister of Indian Affairs and Northern Development, helping persuade Prime Minister Pierre Trudeau to begin land settlement negotiations between the federal government and the First Nations.

In 1976, Marchand was appointed to the Cabinet as Minister of State for small business. He was the first Status Indian to be appointed to a cabinet position. In 1977, he was promoted to Minister of the Environment, and held the post until his and the government's defeat in the 1979 election.

Marchand returned to British Columbia where he became administrator for the Nicola Valley Indian Administration. In 1984, he was appointed to the Senate, the second Aboriginal Canadian to be appointed (the first was James Gladstone). Marchand persuaded the Upper House to establish the Senate Committee on Aboriginal Peoples, on which he served as chairman.

Marchand retired from the Senate in 1998 at the age of 64, eleven years ahead of the mandatory retirement age, in order to spend more time in British Columbia. He died on June 3, 2016.

Family 
Marchard is the father of Leonard Marchand Jr., a justice of the British Columbia Court of Appeal.

Legacy and honours
In 1999, he was made a Member of the Order of Canada.
In 2000, Caitlin Press published his autobiography, Breaking Trail.
In 2014, Marchand received the Order of British Columbia.

 Marchand was sworn in as a Member of the Queen's Privy Council for Canada on 15 September 1976, giving him the accordant style "The Honourable" and the post-nominal letters "PC" for life.
 In 1999, Marchand was given the honorary degree of Doctor of Laws from Thompson Rivers University.

Archives 
There is a Leonard Marchand fonds at Library and Archives Canada.

References

External links
Leonard Marchand: The first Status Indian elected to Canada's Parliament
 
Amazon.ca listing of "Breaking Trail.

1933 births
2016 deaths
First Nations politicians
Canadian senators from British Columbia
Liberal Party of Canada MPs
Liberal Party of Canada senators
Members of the House of Commons of Canada from British Columbia
Members of the Order of Canada
Members of the Order of British Columbia
Members of the King's Privy Council for Canada
People from Vernon, British Columbia
Syilx people
Indigenous Members of the House of Commons of Canada
Indigenous Canadian senators
Indspire Awards
 University of Idaho alumni
 university of British Columbia alumni